Pantelej (Serbian Cyrillic: Пантелеј) is one of five city municipalities which constitute the city of Niš. According to the 2011 census, the municipality has a population of 53,486 inhabitants.

Geography
The municipality borders Crveni Krst municipality in the west, Svrljig municipality in the north, Niška Banja municipality in the south-east, and Medijana municipality in the south.

Demographics
According to the 2011 census, the municipality had a population of 53,486 inhabitants, with 34,724 in the eponymous settlement.

Settlements
The municipality consists of 14 settlements, all of which are classified as rural, except for Pantelej, which is a part of a larger urban settlement of Niš.

Neighbourhoods

 Pantelej
 Jagodin Mala (partly)
 Durlan
 Vrežina
 Čalije
 Somborska
 Durlan 2
 Durlan 3

See also
 Subdivisions of Serbia
 Niš

References

External links

 www.pantelej.org.rs

Municipalities of Niš